Jonas Martin Nordquist (born April 26, 1982) is a Swedish former professional ice hockey centre, who last played for EC KAC in Austrian Hockey League (EBEL). Nordquist was drafted by the Chicago Blackhawks in the 2nd round of the 2000 NHL Entry Draft (49th overall). He played in three games in the 2006-07 season with the Blackhawks, recording 2 assists.

Playing career
He has predominantly played in his native Sweden, appearing in over 500 games with Leksands IF, Luleå HF, Frölunda HC and Brynäs IF in the Swedish Hockey League before signing an optional two-year contract in Austria, with EC KAC of the EBEL on April 13, 2015.

After one season in Klagenfurt, helping the club with 19 points in 46 games, Nordstrom's tenure with the club was ended after it exercising an opt-out clause on March 23, 2016.

In 2017 Nordquist ended his career as a player.

Career statistics

Regular season and playoffs

International

Awards and honors

Transactions
 June 24, 2000 - Drafted by the Chicago Blackhawks in the 2nd round, 49th overall.
 September 15, 2009 - Signed a three-year contract with Brynäs IF

References

External links

1982 births
Brynäs IF players
Chicago Blackhawks draft picks
Chicago Blackhawks players
Frölunda HC players
EC KAC players
Leksands IF players
Living people
Luleå HF players
Norfolk Admirals players
Rögle BK players
People from Leksand Municipality
Swedish ice hockey centres
Sportspeople from Dalarna County